The New South Wales Country Eagles is an Australian rugby union football team competes in the National Rugby Championship (NRC). The team was founded by a group of patrons associated with country rugby in New South Wales. The Eagles team plays home matches in regional centres of New South Wales including Armidale, Goulburn, Orange, and Tamworth.

Name and colours
The Country Eagles are named for the wedge-tailed eagle, the largest bird of prey found in Australia. The team logo features a wedge-tailed eagle and, as the bird's feathers are mainly black with deep golden coloured highlights on the neck and wings, black and gold were adopted as the team's original colours. The logo and mascot, “Wedgie”, were chosen in consultation with the NSW Country Rugby Union to differentiate the team from the existing Cockatoos representative side. The Eagles colours, however, remain similar to the traditional black and gold (amber) colours worn by NSW Country.

Sponsorship
Elders Limited formed a partnership with NSW Country Eagles in 2015, and has been the team's main front-of-jersey sponsor since 2016. The major naming sponsor of the Country Eagles for the 2014 and 2015 seasons was Charles Sturt University (CSU).

History
The ARU announced in December 2013 that the National Rugby Championship (NRC) would commence in 2014. Expressions of interest were open to all parties, with the accepted bids announced in early 2014. A group of rugby patrons headed by businessmen Rick Hutchinson and Peter Tonkin (son of former Wallaby Arthur Tonkin) founded the bid for a New South Wales Country team. On 24 March 2014, it was announced that New South Wales Country would be in the new competition.

The first general manager of the NSW Country Eagles, former Wallabies player James Grant, stated in 2014 that the team would be based in Sydney but travel to regional centres in New South Wales to play home games. Cities including Orange, Dubbo, Mudgee, Lismore, Tamworth, Moree, Armidale and Newcastle expressed an interest in staging matches.

Originally it was thought that the NSW Country team for the NRC would be wholly composed of city-based players of country origin, but a goal of recruiting between four and eight players that were country-based was announced. In the early years of the competition. Sydney clubs Easts and Randwick had a direct link as feeder clubs for the NSW Country team in the NRC. Ahead of the 2016 season, the Sydney University club took a 25% stake in the team  and provided many Eagles players from that season onwards.

Darren Coleman was appointed as the first head coach of NSW Country team in 2014. Coleman had previously guided Japanese team Toyota Shokki to Top League promotion for the 2013–14 season. Prior to that, he was also the assistant coach of the Central Coast Rays team which won the ARC in 2007. Coleman continued as head coach through to 2018.

Grounds

The NSW Country team plays its home matches in regional centres of New South Wales. In previous seasons, the team has also hosted some games in Sydney. The team has its training base at the University of NSW in Sydney’s eastern suburbs, the same facility used by the Waratahs.

The team has scheduled home matches at the following locations:

Current squad
The squad for the 2019 NRC season:
</onlyinclude>

Records

Honours
National Rugby Championship
Runners-up: 2016
Playoff appearances: 2014
Horan-Little Shield
Season winners: 2016

Season standings
National Rugby Championship
{| class="wikitable" style="text-align:center;"
|- border=1 cellpadding=5 cellspacing=0
! style="width:20px;"|Year
! style="width:20px;"|Pos
! style="width:20px;"|Pld
! style="width:20px;"|W
! style="width:20px;"|D
! style="width:20px;"|L
! style="width:20px;"|F
! style="width:20px;"|A
! style="width:25px;"|+/-
! style="width:20px;"|BP
! style="width:20px;"|Pts
! style="width:25em; text-align:left;"|  Play-offs
|-
|2018
|7th
| 7 || 1 || 0 || 6 || 140 || 280 || −140 || 2 || 6
|align=left|  Did not compete
|-
|2017
|5th
| 8 || 4 || 1 || 3 || 219 || 217 ||  +2 || 2 || 20
|align=left|  Did not compete
|-
|2016
|1st
| 7 || 6 || 0 || 1 || 280 || 190 || +90 || 4 || 28
|align=left|  Grand final loss to Perth Spirit  by 20–16.
|-
|2015
|5th
| 8 || 4 || 0 || 4 || 225 || 260 || −35 || 3|| 19
|align=left|  Did not compete
|-
|2014
|2nd
| 8 || 6 || 0 || 2 || 251 || 202 || +49 || 3 || 27
|align=left|  Semi-final loss to Brisbane City  by 26–32.
|}

Head coaches
 Robert Taylor (2019)
 Darren Coleman (2014–2018)

Captains
 Ned Hanigan (2019)
 Paddy Ryan (2016–2018)
 Jono Lance (2015)
 Matthew Carraro, Cameron Treloar (2014)

Squads
{| class="collapsible collapsed" style=" width: 100%; margin: 0px; border: 1px solid darkgray; border-spacing: 3px;"
|-
! colspan="10" style="background-color:#f2f2f2; cell-border:2px solid black; padding-left: 1em; padding-right: 1em; text-align: center;" |2016 NSW Country Eagles squad – NRC
|-
| colspan="10" |The squad for the 2016 National Rugby Championship season:

|-
| width="3%"| 
| width="30%" style="font-size: 95%;" valign="top"|

Props
 Cam Betham
 Jed Gillespie
 Samuel Needs
 Tom Robertson
 Paddy Ryan (c)
 Sonny Suatala

Hookers
 Folau Fainga'a
 Tolu Latu

Locks
 Tim Buchanan
 Ned Hanigan
 Ryan McCauley
 Dean Mumm1
 Will Munro

| width="3%"| 
| width="30%" style="font-size: 95%;" valign="top"|

Loose Forwards
 Mark Baldwin
 Sam Croke
 Tom Cusack
 Rohan O’Regan
 Rowan Perry
 Jake Wainwright
 Sam Ward

Scrum-halves
 Jake Gordon
 Nick Phipps1
 Mitchell Short

Fly-halves
 Tayler Adams
 Andrew Deegan
 Bernard Foley1

| width="3%"| 
| width="30%" style="font-size: 95%;" valign="top"|

Centres
 Samuel Figg
 Kyle Godwin
 Tom Hill
 David Horwitz
 Apakuki Ma’afu

Wingers
 Charlie Clifton
 Christian Kagiassis
 Andrew Kellaway
 Reece Robinson
 Ernest Suavua
 Joel Brooks
 Jarome McKenzie
 Tom Merritt

Fullbacks
 Alex Newsome
 Angus Roberts

(c) Team captainBold denotes internationally capped players at the time1 Allocated national player additional to the contracted squad.
|}

{| class="collapsible collapsed" style=" width: 100%; margin: 0px; border: 1px solid darkgray; border-spacing: 3px;"
|-
! colspan="10" style="background-color:#f2f2f2; cell-border:2px solid black; padding-left: 1em; padding-right: 1em; text-align: center;" |2015 NSW Country Eagles squad – NRC
|-
| colspan="10" |The squad for the 2015 National Rugby Championship season:

|-
| width="3%"| 
| width="30%" style="font-size: 95%;" valign="top"|

Props
 Andrew Collins
 David Feao
 Dashville Kuate
 Dane Maraki
 Jerome Vaai

Hookers
 Ryan Dalziel
 Peter Nau
 Tom Sexton

Locks
 Jock Armstrong
 Sam Carter1
 BJ Edwards
 Tom Staniforth
 Ned Hanigan
 Nicholas Palmer

| width="3%"| 
| width="30%" style="font-size: 95%;" valign="top"|

Loose Forwards
 Mark Baldwin 
 Sam Croke
 Sam Lousi
 Will Miller (vc)
 Beau Robinson
 Pauli Tuala
 Tyrone Viiga

Scrum-halves
 Michael Dowsett
 Jock Merriman

Fly-halves
 David Horwitz
 Jono Lance (c)
 Matt To'omua1

| width="3%"| 
| width="30%" style="font-size: 95%;" valign="top"|

Centres
 Samuel Figg
 Brogan Roods
 Ed Stubbs

Wingers
 Joel Brooks
 Charlie Clifton
 Andrew Kellaway
 Jarome McKenzie
 Tom Merritt

Fullbacks
 David Harvey
 Will Fay

(c) Team captainBold denotes internationally capped players at the time1 Allocated national player additional to the contracted squad.
|}

{| class="collapsible collapsed" style=" width: 100%; margin: 0px; border: 1px solid darkgray; border-spacing: 3px;"
|-
! colspan="10" style="background-color:#f2f2f2; cell-border:2px solid black; padding-left: 1em; padding-right: 1em; text-align: center;" |2014 NSW Country Eagles squad – NRC
|-
| colspan="10" |The squad for the 2014 National Rugby Championship season:

|-
| width="3%"| 
| width="30%" style="font-size: 95%;" valign="top"|

Props
 Michael Ala'alatoa
 Duncan Chubb
 Jake Ilnicki
 Sekope Kepu1
 Max Lahiff
 Tim Metcher
 Ben Suisala

Hookers
 Ryan Dalziel
 Billy Johnston
 Josh Mann-Rea
 Will Weeks

Locks
 Mitchell Chapman
 Kane Douglas
 Ben Matwijow
 Cameron Treloar

| width="3%"| 
| width="30%" style="font-size: 95%;" valign="top"|

Loose Forwards
 Sam Croke
 Tala Gray
 Stephen Hoiles
 Will Miller
 Pauli Tuala
 Ita Vaea

Scrum-halves
 Darcy Etrich
 Brendan McKibbin
 Michael Snowden
 Nic White1

Fly-halves
 David Horwitz
 Matt To'omua1
 Sam Windsor

| width="3%"| 
| width="30%" style="font-size: 95%;" valign="top"|

Centres
 Adam Ashley-Cooper1
 Matthew Carraro (c)
 Apakuki Ma’afu
 Ed Stubbs
 Chris Tuatara-Morrison
 Samu Wara

Wingers
 Ethan Ford
 John Grant
 Andrew Kellaway
 Misieli Sinoti
 Malakai Watene-Zelezniak

Fullbacks
 Patrick Dellit

(c) Team captainBold denotes internationally capped players at the time1 Allocated national player additional to the contracted squad.
|}

Gallery

See also

 New South Wales Rugby Union (NSWRU)
 New South Wales Country Cockatoos
 Combined New South Wales–Queensland Country

References

External links 
 NRC page on .nswwaratahs.com.au

Archives

National Rugby Championship
Rugby clubs established in 2014
2014 establishments in Australia
Rugby union teams in New South Wales
Rugby union clubs disestablished in 2020
2020 disestablishments in Australia